The Crystal 23 is a British trailerable sailboat that was designed by Alan Buchanan as a cruiser and first built in 1961.

The Crystal 23 was later developed into the Buchanan-designed 1967 Halcyon 23.

Production
The design was built by French Brothers and Seamaster Limited, and were fitted out by Stebbings & Sons in the United Kingdom, starting in 1961, but it is now out of production.

Design
The Halcyon 23 is a recreational keelboat, built predominantly of glassfibre, with wood trim. It has a masthead sloop rig, a spooned raked stem, an angled transom, a transom-hung rudder controlled by a tiller and a fixed fin keel with a weighted bulb or optional bildge keels. It displaces  and carries  of iron ballast.

It is fitted with a Swedish Volvo inboard engine for docking and maneuvering.

See also
List of sailing boat types

References

Keelboats
1960s sailboat type designs
Sailing yachts
Trailer sailers
Sailboat type designs by Alan Buchanan
Sailboat types built by Stebbings & Sons
Sailboat types built by French Brothers
Sailboat types built by Seamaster Limited